Gūrwēk is a town in North Waziristan in the Federally Administered Tribal Areas of Pakistan, on the border with Afghanistan.

Gurwek is famous for being the site from where Mirzali Khan (Faqir of Ipi) led his guerrilla warfare, first against the British Empire, and later against the newly created government of Pakistan. It was in this town that Mirzali Khan symbolically declared his independent state of Pashtunistan.

On May 11, 2010, at least 24 "suspected militants" were killed in Gurwek and Datta Khel from two drone strikes in Pakistan, in which the US fired up to 18 missiles. In 2014, about 929,859 people were internally displaced from North Waziristan as a result of Operation Zarb-e-Azb, a military offensive conducted by the Pakistan Armed Forces along the Durand Line, which is the international border between Pakistan and Afghanistan

See also
Mirzali Khan
Mullah Powindah
Sartor Faqir
Umra Khan

References

Populated places in North Waziristan